The Hunter 25 is an American trailerable sailboat, designed by John Cherubini and Bob Seidelmann and first built in 1972.

The original Hunter 25, sometimes called the Mark I, had a wedge-shaped cabin trunk, but a square, "box top" Mark II version was also produced.

A newly designed Hunter 25 was introduced in 2005 and is often referred to as the Hunter 25-2 to differentiate it from this design.

Production
The boat was the first design constructed by Hunter Marine in the United States and was built between 1972 and 1983.

Design
The Hunter 25 is a small recreational keelboat, built predominantly of fiberglass. It has a masthead sloop rig, an internally-mounted spade-type rudder and a fixed fin keel. Both carry  of ballast.

The boat is normally fitted with a small  outboard motor for docking and maneuvering.

The design has sleeping accommodation for five people, with a double "V"-berth in the bow cabin, two straight settee berths in the main cabin and an aft single berth on the port side. The galley is located on the  starboard side just forward of the companionway ladder. The galley is "L"-shaped and is equipped with a two-burner stove and a sink. The head is located just aft of the bow cabin on the starboard side.

The boat has a PHRF racing average handicap of 240.

Operational history
In a 2010 review Steve Henkel wrote, "the Hunter 25 was the first sailboat design to be produced by Hunter. It was a success, and in 1977 was followed by the Hunter 25 Mark II, which retained the hull and layout below but sported a new and boxy deck with six inches more headroom. There were several pet names for the Mk I, with her low-domed cabintop and coaming going around the edge of the spray hood, including 'bubble top' and 'spitfire canopy.' After the Mk II came
along, the names that stuck were 'wedge top' for the earlier design and 'box top' for the later, taller cabin."

See also
List of sailing boat types

Similar sailboats
Bayfield 25
Beneteau First 25S
C&C 25
Capri 25
Catalina 25
Kirby 25
MacGregor 25
Mirage 25
O'Day 25
Redline 25
Tanzer 25
US Yachts US 25

References

Keelboats
1970s sailboat type designs
Sailing yachts
Trailer sailers
Sailboat type designs by John Cherubini
Sailboat type designs by Bob Seidelmann
Sailboat types built by Hunter Marine